The R. V. Jones Intelligence Award was created by the CIA in 1993 to honour those whose accomplishments mirror in substance and style those of R. V. Jones, to wit: "Scientific acumen applied with art in the cause of freedom". Jones thus became the first recipient.

Recipients of the R. V. Jones Intelligence Award

1999 – William J. Perry, former US Secretary of Defense
1996 – Richard L. Garwin, scientist
1994 – Albert Wheelon, former deputy director for Science and Technology, CIA
1993 – R. V. Jones

External links
CIA Press Release

Awards established in 1993
American awards
Intelligence and espionage-related awards and decorations